The Heavy Woollen Derby refers to the rivalry between Batley Bulldogs and Dewsbury Rams, both located in the Heavy Woollen district of West Yorkshire. The two sides compete an annual friendly on Boxing Day to celebrate their rivalry.

Head-to-head record
Statistics correct as of 19/5/21

In all competitions, competitive and uncompetitive:

Meetings in major finals
The two sides have never met in a major final.

Collective Honours

Boxing Day Challenge

The Boxing Day Challenge is an annual Rugby league friendly match that takes place on 26th December. The venue alternates between the two sides' home grounds: Crown Flatt (The Tetley's Stadium) and the Fox's Biscuits Stadium (Mount Pleasant) respectively.

Results

See also

Festive Challenge
West Yorkshire derbies
Derbies in the Rugby Football League

Notes

References

Batley Bulldogs
Dewsbury Rams
Rugby league rivalries
Sports rivalries in the United Kingdom
Boxing Day